is a Japanese manga series by Kengo Hanazawa. It was adapted into a live action film in 2010 and a drama in 2012.

Plot
A 29-year-old lonesome salesman falls in love with an attractive woman from work but he has a rival that ends up being with her. He takes up boxing to fight his rival.

Media

Manga
Written and illustrated by Kengo Hanazawa, Boys on the Run was serialized in Shogakukan's seinen manga magazine Weekly Big Comic Spirits from August 8, 2005, to June 9, 2008. Shogakukan collected its chapters in ten tankōbon volumes, released from November 30, 2005 to June 30, 2008.

Volume list

Film

Cast
 Kazunobu Mineta - Tanishi Toshiyuki
 Mei Kurokawa
 You

Drama

Cast
 Ryuhei Maruyama - Tanishi Toshiyuki
 Airi Taira - Hana Ooiwa
 Takumi Saito - Takahiro Aoyama
 Tatsuya Ueda - Ryu Ando
 Akina Minami - Chiharu Uemura 
 Miyoko Asada - Masako Tanishi 
 Eriko Sato - Shiho 
 Takanori Jinnai -Suzuki
 Seishu Uragami - Shu Shishido
 Yu Tokui - Kazuo Tanishi
 Morooka Moro - Saida
 David Ito - Tanaka
 Asami Usuda - Akane Hasegawa
 Atsushi - Yoshihisa

Episode list

Notes

References

External links
 Official film website (archived) 
 
 Official drama website (archived) 
 Japan Times Online film review
 

2005 manga
Live-action films based on manga
Manga adapted into films
Seinen manga
Shogakukan franchises
Japanese boxing films